Milan Corryn (born 4 April 1999) is a Belgian professional footballer who plays as a midfielder for Dutch club Almere City.

Club career
Corryn made his Fortuna Liga debut for AS Trenčín in a 2–0 win against Senica on 15 September 2018 away at the Štadión FK Senica. He came on in the 77th minute replacing Joey Sleegers and was booked with a yellow card immediately after.

On 26 June 2021, he signed a two-year contract with an option for a one-year extension with Polish Ekstraklasa club Warta Poznań. On 3 December 2022, it was announced his agreement with the club was terminated by mutual consent.

On 16 January 2023, Corryn signed a 1.5-year contract with Almere City in the Netherlands.

References

External links
 AS Trenčín official profile
 Futbalnet profile
 
 

1999 births
Living people
Belgian footballers
Belgium youth international footballers
Association football midfielders
R.S.C. Anderlecht players
AS Trenčín players
Warta Poznań players
Almere City FC players
Slovak Super Liga players
Ekstraklasa players
Belgian expatriate footballers
Expatriate footballers in Poland
Expatriate footballers in Slovakia
Expatriate footballers in the Netherlands
Belgian expatriate sportspeople in Poland
Belgian expatriate sportspeople in Slovakia
Belgian expatriate sportspeople in the Netherlands